Matheus Rezende Assis (born 17 March 1995) is a Brazilian footballer who currently plays as a midfielder for Anápolis.

Career statistics

Club

Notes

References

External links
Goiás Profile

1995 births
Living people
Brazilian footballers
Association football midfielders
Campeonato Brasileiro Série B players
Goiás Esporte Clube players
Boa Esporte Clube players